Kołaczek may refer to:

Kołaczek, Masovian Voivodeship, Poland
Kołaczek, West Pomeranian Voivodeship, Poland